The 2016 Rugby Europe Sevens Conferences were the lower divisions of Rugby Europe's 2016 sevens season. Conference 1 was held in Burgas, Bulgaria, with the two top-placing teams advancing to the 2017 Trophy, while Conference 2 was held in Esztergom, Hungary, with the top two advancing to Conference 1 for 2017.

Conference 1

Final standings

All Matches were held in Burgas, Bulgaria.

Pool Stage

Pool A

Pool B

Knockout stage

Bowl

Plate

Cup

Conference 2

All matches were held in Esztergom, Hungary

Final standings

Pool stage

Pool A

Pool B

Knockout stage

Bowl

Cup

References

Conferences
2016 rugby sevens competitions
2016 in Bulgarian sport
2016 in Hungarian sport